Raffaella Reggi (born 27 November 1965) is a former professional tennis player from Italy.

Career
As a junior, Reggi won the Orange Bowl 16 and under in 1981.  She was a member of the Continental Players Cup Team in 1982.

Reggi won the mixed doubles title at the US Open in 1986, partnering Sergio Casal. She was a singles quarter-finalist at the French Open in 1987, and reached a career-high singles ranking of World No. 13 in 1988. One of the highlights of her career was winning the Italian Open in 1985.

In 1985 she became the first Italian woman to win the Italian Open since Annelies Ullstein-Bossi won in 1950. Ullstein-Bossi, Reggi, and 2014 finalist Sara Errani are the only Italian women to reach the singles final of Italy's top tennis tournament since World War II.

Reggi finished her career with five singles titles and four doubles titles.  She was a member of the Italian Fed Cup team from 1982 through 1991 and the Italian Olympic Team in 1988 and 1992.  She had career victories over Steffi Graf, Chris Evert, Evonne Goolagong, Jana Novotná, Hana Mandlíková, Manuela Maleeva, Nathalie Tauziat, Helena Suková, Claudia Kohde-Kilsch, Zina Garrison, and Jo Durie.

Grand Slam finals

Mixed Doubles: 1 (1 title)

WTA Tour finals

Singles: 11 (5–6)

Doubles: 14 (4–10)

Grand Slam singles performance timeline

References

External links
 
 
 

1965 births
Hopman Cup competitors
Italian female tennis players
Living people
Olympic tennis players of Italy
Sportspeople from the Province of Ravenna
Tennis players at the 1984 Summer Olympics
Tennis players at the 1988 Summer Olympics
Tennis players at the 1992 Summer Olympics
US Open (tennis) champions
Grand Slam (tennis) champions in mixed doubles